The 2017–18 Hong Kong Third Division League was the 4th season of Hong Kong Third Division since it became the fourth-tier football league in Hong Kong in 2014–15. The season began on 16 September 2017 and ended on 13 May 2018.

Teams

Changes from last season

From Third Division
Promoted to Second Division
 Happy Valley
 Fu Moon
 GFC Friends
 Fukien

Eliminated from league
 Telecom
 King Mountain

To Third Division
Relegated from Second Division
 Kwok Keung
 Tuen Mun FC

League table

References

Hong Kong Third Division League seasons
2017–18 in Hong Kong football